Special rights is a term originally used by conservatives and libertarians  to refer to laws granting rights to one or more groups that are not extended to other groups. Ideas of special rights are controversial, as they clash with the principle of equality before the law.

Potential examples of special rights include affirmative action policies or hate crime legislation with regard to ethnic, religious or sexual minorities or state recognition of marriage as a group with different taxation from those who are not married. However, the term has often been extended to include some policies that are only seeking simple equality, such as LGBT rights, and some other civil rights movements.

Concepts of special rights are closely aligned with notions of group rights and identity politics.

Other uses
More recently, social conservatives have used the term to more narrowly refer to measures that extend existing rights for heterosexual couples to gays and lesbians, such as in the case of same sex marriage, or that include sexual orientation as a civil rights minority group.

The term is also used internationally. In German the term Sonderrechte
(de), with the same literal meaning, is used in senses like 'privileges', 'special legislations' or 'special exemptions'.

Legal argument
The basis behind the argument of the term is based on whether it should be considered just and legal for a law to treat various parties unequally. For example, in the US Constitution the prohibition on bills of attainder require that laws do not single out a single person or group of persons for specific treatment.

Another example is the equal protection clause in the Fourteenth Amendment. Both sides argue that the other side is or has traditionally been singled out and so the law is either needed or unnecessary.

In some cases, such as those with social implications, the universal definition of rights also often conflict with other, often more regional or local, laws that require certain public standards or behavior based on cultural norms.

Libertarianism on rights and special rights
In The Encyclopedia of Libertarianism, Eric Mack states:

A too-ready acceptance of alleged rights leads to an oppressive list of enforceable obligations. As the list of others' rights grows, each of us is subject to a growing burden made up of the obligations correlative to those rights; correspondingly the ability of rights to be protective of individual choice dissolves. Moreover, as the list of rights grows, so too does the legitimate role of political and legal institutions, and the libertarian case for radically limiting the scope and power of such institutions withers away. Libertarian theories of rights avoid generating an oppressive list of obligations through the employment of two crucial distinctions – the distinction between negative and positive rights and the distinction between general and special rights.

Definition of minorities
Minority rights advocacy groups often contend that such protections confer no special rights, and describe these laws instead as protecting equal rights, due to past conditions or legal privileges for specific groups.

See also
 Civil Rights
 Homophobia
 "Homosexual agenda"
 Human rights
 Marriage Equality
 Prerogative rights
 Qualified immunity

Potential Examples:
 Racial quota
 All-women shortlists

References

Political terminology
Libertarian terms
Equality rights
Affirmative action
Identity politics